Fletcher is an unincorporated community in western Jefferson County, Missouri, United States.

The community lies on Calico Creek approximately one-half mile east of the Jefferson-Washington county line.  It is located approximately ten miles west of De Soto along Missouri Route H.

A post office called Fletcher has been in operation since 1896. The community was named after Missouri governor Thomas Clement Fletcher (1827–1899), who served 1865–1869.

References

Unincorporated communities in Jefferson County, Missouri
Populated places established in 1896
Unincorporated communities in Missouri